Ibrahim bin Abdul-Aziz Abul-Majdi, better known as Shaykh al-Islam Ibrahim al-Desouki, was an Egyptian Imam and the founder of the Desouki Order, (also known as the Burhaniyyah tariqa (Sufi order).

Life 
Ibrahim al-Desouki, also known as Ibrahim al-Desuqi, was born in Desouk on the Nile Delta and lived there his whole life, hence his attribution to it. According to traditions and popular sayings, He is a descendant of Ali ibn Abi Talib from his paternal side and to the Caliph of the Desouki order in Egypt from his maternal side. Ibrahim al-Desouki was influenced by the Shadhili tariqa (Sufi order), and was as-well close to his contemporary Sufi Ahmad al-Badawi of Tanta. He became Shaykh al-Islam of Egypt during  the Sultan of Egypt and Syria, Al-Malik al-Zahir al-Din Baybars al-Bunduqdari (Baibars)'s rule.

Shaykh Ibrahim al-Desouki, was born on the last night of Sha'ban. When the scholars doubted the emergence of the first day for the month of Ramadan, Shaykh Ibn Harun al-Shufi then said, "look at this newborn child, does he drink his mother's milk?", so his mother replied, "from the time of the call to prayer, he stopped drinking his mother's milk". Thus Shaykh Ibn Harun declared that day as the first day of the month of Ramadan. Scholars say the signs of the saintliness of Shaykh Ibrahim al-Desouki have been made apparent from the moment of his birth.

Ibrahim al-Desouki is the fourth and final (Wali al-Qutb) after Shaykh Ahmad al-Rifa'i, Shaykh Abdul Qadir Gilani, and Shaykh Ahmad al-Badawi, as believed by the scholars of Tasawwuf (Sufism) such as Sheikh Mahmud al-Garbawi in his book (al-Ayatuz'zahirah fi Manaqib al-Awliya 'wal Aqthab al-Arba'ah), and Sayyid Abul-Huda Muhammad bin Hasan al-Khalidi al-Shayyadi in his book (Farhat al-Ahbab fi Akhbar al-Arba'ah al-Ahbab) and in another book of his titled, (Qiladat al-Jawahir fi Zikril Gawtsirrifa'i wa Atba'ihil Akabir.

In the book of Tabaqat al-Kubra, you will find Shaykh Abd al-Wahhab al-Sha'rani talking about Shaykh Abul al-Hasan al-Shadhili, Shaykh Ahmad al-Rifa'i, Shaykh Abdul Qadir Gilani, Shaykh Ahmad al-Badawi, and Shaykh Ibrahim al-Desuqi.

653 births
694 deaths